Europe in Winter is a 2016 science fiction novel by English writer Dave Hutchinson.  Is the third novel in The Fractured Europe series. In 2017 Europe in Winter won the BSFA Award for Best Novel. 

Rudi, the former chef-turned-spy, returns on a mission to uncover the truth—in a fractured Europe utterly changed by the public unveiling of the Community.

References

External links

2016 British novels
2016 science fiction novels
English science fiction novels
Solaris Books books